The A5 highway is a highway in Lithuania (Magistralinis kelias). It runs from Kaunas to the Polish border, toward Suwałki and ultimately Warsaw. A section of the A5 highway - Kaunas-Marijampolė, has been upgraded to a motorway, accessed only via grade-separated junctions. It is the first motorway built after Lithuania entered the European Union in 2004.

The remainder of the road is being upgraded to motorway specifications. It will connect Kaunas with expressway S61 in Poland. The road will be only motorway connection between the Lithuanian motorway network and the rest of the European motorway network.

Most of the A5 highway is coded Via Baltica in the European route system. The E67 highway ultimately connects Prague with Tallinn/Helsinki.

Principal cities along the route 
Kaunas
Marijampolė

Roads in Lithuania